Cveto Pretnar (27 January 1957 – 25 April 2018) was a Slovenian ice hockey goaltender. He played for the Yugoslavia men's national ice hockey team at the 1984 Winter Olympics in Sarajevo. Pretnar stopped twenty-one shots in the second period of Yugoslavia's 0-11 loss to Sweden.

Pretnar died on 25 April 2018 at the age of 61.

References

1957 births
2018 deaths
HK Acroni Jesenice players
Ice hockey players at the 1984 Winter Olympics
Olympic ice hockey players of Yugoslavia
Slovenian ice hockey goaltenders
Sportspeople from Jesenice, Jesenice
Yugoslav ice hockey goaltenders